Nida Jay (born September 2, 1985) is a Pakistani novelist who writes in the English language. She is the recipient of numerous international awards, amongst them the Dunnen First Novel Prize. The debut novel Heart of Eternity published by Mirador has gained worldwide plaudits and recognition making Jay an influential name in philosophical and religious literature. Jay is a Fellow of the Royal Society of Literature and is also a member of the Stanford University vibrant group of literary scholars

Jay was born and raised in a Kashmiri family in Lahore. She has an MA in Creative Writing and Literature from Kinnaird College, and an MFA from the MFA Program for Poets & Writers at the University of Reading, where she was influenced by Rumi and Dante. In 2010, she moved to the United Arab Emirates and currently lives in Dubai with her husband and two children. Jay frequently travels to the United Kingdom and Lahore where her family resides.

Writing career

In 2013, Jay published her Debut Novel Heart of Eternity through Mirador press in the United Kingdom. With the draft compilation of her second novel, Heart of Eternity took off. Heart of Eternity was shortlisted for the Guardian First Book Award in the Religion and Philosophy category. I don't care about philosophies or trends. “I don't care about vocabulary. What is important to me is whether the narrative is good or not. My protagonists are experiencing what I experience as I write, which is also what the readers experience as they read. In the nineteenth and early twentieth centuries, writers offered the real thing; that was their task. In War and Peace, Tolstoy describes the battleground so closely that the readers believe it’s the real thing. But that is not my aim. I'm not pretending it’s the real thing. We are living in a fake world; we are fighting a fake war, the existing social order is a swindle and its cherished beliefs are mostly delusions. But we still manage to find reality in all of these", Jay mentioned in one of her interviews with Alan Jacob.

Jay has appeared on numerous newspapers, podcasts and TV shows including BBC radio, Voice of America, Webbweaver books, Guardian, New York Times, The Ellen DeGeneres Show, and Khaleej Times. In 2015, she was included in the Granta list of 20 best young British writers.

Heart of Eternity

Heart of Eternity has inspired a devoted following around the world. It is a metaphorically written story that has all the components of a Shakespearean tragedy. The references are subtly borrowed from John Milton and Dante. Some of the critics have stated that reading this story has melted and broken their hearts at the same time. Many celebrities have declared Heart of Eternity to be their favorite novel including Kate Winslet, N Jones and Michael Bay.

Social media

Jay is a writer with a very strong community online. The author has thousands of fans only on her Facebook main page and thousands more followers on Twitter. She also has private accounts on Instagram, Pinterest and Tumblr, among others as well as an Author Blog where she keeps a strong interaction with her readers.

References

1985 births
Pakistani novelists
English-language writers from Pakistan
Living people
University of Massachusetts Amherst MFA Program for Poets & Writers alumni